Carles Gil de Pareja Vicent (born 22 November 1992) is a Spanish professional footballer who plays as an attacking midfielder for New England Revolution in Major League Soccer.

He began his career at Valencia, playing mostly in their reserves and making his debut with the first team in 2014. He also spent two seasons on loan at Elche, winning promotion to La Liga in 2013. After a spell in the Premier League with Aston Villa and a return to Spain with Deportivo La Coruña, he signed for the New England Revolution.

Club career

Valencia
Born in Valencia, Valencian Community, Gil was a product of Valencia CF's youth system, having joined the club at the age of five. He made his senior debut at only 17 with the reserves by playing one game in Segunda División B, being brought to the main squad for the 2010, 2011 and 2012 pre-seasons and scoring the third goal in the latter against SV Rödinghausen (4–0 away win). Shortly after, he earned a professional contract until 2016.

Gil was loaned to neighbouring Elche CF for the 2012–13 campaign. He first played in Segunda División on 19 August 2012, starting in a home game against SD Ponferradina and netting in an eventual 4–2 win. He scored in the following match, a 2–1 victory at Hércules CF.

After being a very important attacking unit as the club returned to La Liga after nearly 25 years, Gil remained with Elche for 2013–14, still owned by the Che. He made his debut in the competition on 19 August 2013, in a 3–0 loss at Rayo Vallecano.

Gil scored his first goal in the top flight on 1 March 2014, the game's only goal in a home win over RC Celta de Vigo. He subsequently returned to Valencia, making his league debut on 29 August in a 3–0 home defeat of Málaga CF.

Gil scored his first league goal for Valencia on 28 September 2014, contributing to a 1–1 away draw against Real Sociedad.

Aston Villa
Gil joined Premier League side Aston Villa on 13 January 2015 for a fee in the region of £3.2 million, signing a four-and-a-half year deal and receiving the number 25 jersey. He made his debut four days later, as a 59th-minute substitute for Ashley Westwood in a 0–2 home loss to Liverpool; despite the result, manager Paul Lambert described his performance as "as good a debut as I've seen".

Gil made his first start on 25 January 2015 in an FA Cup tie against Bournemouth, scoring from the edge of the box to open a 2–1 victory. Thirteen days later he contributed his first assist for the Villans, allowing Jores Okore to score through a close-range header in a 1–2 home defeat to Chelsea.

Gil netted for the first time in the league on 13 September 2015, putting his team 2–0 up in an eventual 3–2 loss at Leicester City. The following 2 January, away to Sunderland, he equalised with an aerial volley from compatriot Adama Traoré's cross, but in a 3–1 defeat against their relegation rivals.

Deportivo
On 20 July 2016, Gil returned to his homeland's top flight, being loaned to Deportivo de La Coruña with an option to buy. The following 12 July the move was extended for a further season, with an obligatory buyout clause included. His team was eventually relegated, and he played only six minutes after the appointment of new coach Clarence Seedorf.

New England Revolution
On 30 January 2019, Gil joined the New England Revolution as a Designated Player on a multi-year contract, for a club record transfer fee of $2 million. He scored on his Major League Soccer debut on 2 March, the equaliser in a 1–1 draw at FC Dallas.

Gil eventually became the Revs' captain and finished his first season with ten goals and 14 assists, helping lead the side to their first playoff appearance since 2015. His play earned him several awards, including MLS Newcomer of the Year and Midnight Riders Man of the Year.

In the 2020 campaign, Gil played only 152 minutes by late October because of injuries. He returned in time for the playoffs, scoring in wins over the Montreal Impact and Orlando City SC. Having also assisted three goals in post-season, his contract option for the following year was exercised.

Gil agreed to a further extension on 24 May 2021, until 2024; the deal increased his salary from $2.7 million to put him in the top 10 of the league's earners. In that season, he helped the Massachusetts side to the first Supporters' Shield in their 26-year history, with three games to spare. He finished as the assist leader with 18, winning the MLS Comeback Player of the Year Award while the team set a new points record with 73. The playoff campaign ended in the Eastern Conference semi-finals with a penalty shootout defeat to New York City FC after a 2–2 home draw; he scored with the first attempt. On 7 December, he was named the league's Most Valuable Player.

International career
On 30 August 2013, Julen Lopetegui named Gil in the Spanish under-21 squad for 2015 UEFA European Under-21 Championship qualifiers against Austria and Albania. He made his debut against the latter on 9 September, coming on as a second-half substitute and providing an assist for Jesé's final goal in a 4–0 win in Logroño.

Personal life
Gil's younger brother, Ignacio, is also a footballer and an attacking midfielder. He also came through at Valencia, and the pair are teammates at New England. He missed his sibling's MLS debut in September 2022 due to the birth of his first child.

Career statistics

Club

Honours
Elche
Segunda División: 2012–13

New England Revolution
Supporters' Shield: 2021

Individual
MLS Newcomer of the Year: 2019
MLS Best XI: 2019, 2021
MLS Player of the Month: June 2021
Midnight Riders Man of the Year: 2019, 2021
MLS Comeback Player of the Year: 2021
Landon Donovan MVP Award: 2021
MLS All-Star: 2022

References

External links

Stats and bio at CiberChe 

1992 births
Living people
Spanish footballers
Footballers from Valencia (city)
Association football midfielders
La Liga players
Segunda División players
Segunda División B players
Tercera División players
Valencia CF Mestalla footballers
Valencia CF players
Elche CF players
Deportivo de La Coruña players
Premier League players
Aston Villa F.C. players
Major League Soccer players
New England Revolution players
Designated Players (MLS)
Spain under-21 international footballers
Spanish expatriate footballers
Expatriate footballers in England
Expatriate soccer players in the United States
Spanish expatriate sportspeople in England
Spanish expatriate sportspeople in the United States